Fritz Prossinagg (born 12 August 1930) is an Austrian former middle-distance runner. He competed in the men's 1500 metres at the 1952 Summer Olympics.

References

External links
 

1930 births
Possibly living people
Athletes (track and field) at the 1952 Summer Olympics
Austrian male middle-distance runners
Olympic athletes of Austria
Place of birth missing (living people)